was a Japanese boxer who competed in the 1928 Summer Olympics.

In 1928 he was eliminated in the second round of the bantamweight class after losing his fight to Frank Traynor of Ireland.

1928 Olympic results
Below is the record of Fuji Okamoto, a Japanese bantamweight boxer who competed at the 1928 Amsterdam Olympics:

 Round of 32: bye
 Round of 16: lost to Frank Traynor (Ireland) on points

References

External links

1905 births
1984 deaths
Bantamweight boxers
Olympic boxers of Japan
Boxers at the 1928 Summer Olympics
Japanese male boxers
20th-century Japanese people
People from Aichi Prefecture
Sportspeople from Aichi Prefecture
People from Nagoya
Sportspeople from Nagoya
Presidents of the Japan Pro Boxing Association